Wrae Tower is a ruined 16th-century stone tower house, located in the upper Tweed Valley in the Scottish Borders area of Scotland, and similarly south of the village of Broughton. The ruin is at grid reference , 3 km south-west of Drumelzier. Only a fragment of the north-east corner stair tower, around 9m high and 4m across, remains standing. A single jamb represents the north-west ground floor entrance to the tower and crowning the north-east wall is rough corbelling, which supports the remains of a parapet. The tower was probably built by the Tweedies of Drumelzier, who owned the surrounding lands since 1320.

See also
List of places in the Scottish Borders
List of places in Scotland

References
National Monuments Record of Scotland Site Reference NT13SW 8

External links
SCRAN image: Wrae Tower
Genealogy: Wrae

Houses completed in the 16th century
Towers completed in the 16th century
Castles in the Scottish Borders
Peel towers in the Scottish Borders